Admiral Moore may refer to:

United Kingdom
Arthur Moore (Royal Navy officer) (1847–1934), British Royal Navy admiral
Gordon Moore (Royal Navy officer) (1862–1934), British Royal Navy admiral
Graham Moore (Royal Navy officer) (1764–1843), British Royal Navy admiral
Henry Ruthven Moore (1886–1978), British Royal Navy admiral
Sir John Moore, 1st Baronet (1718–1779), British Royal Navy admiral
Simon Moore (Royal Navy officer) (born 1946), British Royal Navy rear admiral
Thomas Edward Laws Moore (1820–1872), British Royal Navy rear admiral

United States
Charles Brainard Taylor Moore (1853–1923), U.S. Navy rear admiral
Charles Johnes Moore (1889–1974), U.S. Navy rear admiral
Charles W. Moore Jr. (born 1946), U.S. Navy vice admiral
John White Moore (1832–1913), U.S. Navy rear admiral
Nathan A. Moore (fl. 1990s–2020s), U.S. Coast Guard rear admiral 
Scott P. Moore (born 1960), U.S. Navy rear admiral
Thomas Moore (admiral) (born 1959), U.S. Navy vice admiral

Other
George Dunbar Moore (1893–1979), Royal Australian Navy rear admiral